Rodger Doner (12 July 1938 – 4 August 2022) was a Canadian wrestler. He competed in the men's freestyle lightweight at the 1964 Summer Olympics.

References

External links

1938 births
2022 deaths
Canadian male sport wrestlers
Olympic wrestlers of Canada
Wrestlers at the 1964 Summer Olympics
People from Kirkland Lake